Chi Jia Han (born 30 June 1970) is a Hong Kong breaststroke swimmer. He competed in two events at the 1992 Summer Olympics.

References

External links
 

1970 births
Living people
Hong Kong male breaststroke swimmers
Olympic swimmers of Hong Kong
Swimmers at the 1992 Summer Olympics
Place of birth missing (living people)